Jyoti Raj is an Indian free solo climber from Chitradurga, Karnataka.

Known as "Kothi Raju" or "Monkey King", Raj is famous for scaling the Chitradurga Fort without safety harnesses. He does not climb for sports, but to entertain the visitors to the fort.

He is also the only person to have scaled Karnataka's highest waterfall, the 830-foot Jog falls, climbing against the flow. On 13 September 2013, he free soloed the clock tower at Moorusavir Math in Hubli in just over 15 minutes. He did not use any harness, but used chalk for grip.

He made his debut as an actor in Sandalwood with the 2014 film Jyothi aliyas Kothiraja.

He has been called upon numerous times to rescue or retrieve the bodies of people who have fallen down Jog Falls, and on a rescue operation in 2018 he got stuck in a gorge overnight.

References

External links
 Jyohi Raju scaling the Chitradurga Fort
 Film to be made on the ‘Spiderman of Chitradurga

Living people
Indian stunt performers
People from Chitradurga
Sportspeople from Karnataka
Indian rock climbers
Free soloists
1988 births